Ephrem Lopez (born January 25, 1969), known professionally as DJ Enuff is a DJ and radio personality from the United States. He mixes on-air for New York's Hip Hop radio station HOT 97 on weekdays from 4pm to 6pm. He is best known for being The Notorious B.I.G's official road DJ and also helped break acts like 50 Cent, Kanye West, and Future. In 2009 Enuff was able to reprise his role as B.I.G's DJ in the film Notorious. Lopez was born and grew up in Brooklyn.

Personal life
Lopez’s son is a music producer who goes by the name RiotUSA and has produced songs for rapper Ice Spice including the breakout hit Munch (Feelin' U).

Production credits
1996 "Get Money (Remix)" - Junior M.A.F.I.A.
1997 "You're Nobody (Til Somebody Kills You)"- The Notorious B.I.G off the album Life After Death certified Diamond by the Recording Industry Association of America (RIAA), and it has been credited as the third best-selling rap album of all time.

References

External links
Official Website

American hip hop record producers
American hip hop DJs
Living people
1969 births
The Flip Squad members